Gręzów  is a village in the administrative district of Gmina Kotuń, within Siedlce County, Masovian Voivodeship, in east-central Poland.

The village has an approximate population of 470.

References

Villages in Siedlce County